Bañuelos is a surname. Notable people with the surname include:

Antonia Bañuelos (1856–1926), Spanish painter
Enrique Bañuelos (born 1966), Spanish businessman and entrepreneur
Fernanda Bañuelos (born 1997), Mexican volleyball player
Julio Bañuelos (born 1970), Spanish footballer
Luis García Bañuelos (born 1993), Mexican footballer
Manny Bañuelos (born 1991), Mexican baseball player
Romana Acosta Bañuelos (1925–2018), American banker and government official